Paul Douglas Ackerley (16 May 1949 – 3 May 2011) was a field hockey player, maths teacher and public servant from New Zealand. 

He played field hockey at right half. He was a member of the national team that won the gold medal at the 1976 Summer Olympics in Montreal. He was selected for the 1980 Summer Olympics, but most sports in New Zealand boycotted the Moscow games so he did not compete. He had 25 international caps for New Zealand.

Ackerley was born in Dunedin but grew up in Ashburton. He graduated from the University of Canterbury, where he played in the Canterbury University hockey club in the late 1960s. He was a secondary school mathematics teacher at Linwood College, Christchurch and then head of the maths department at Awatapu College, Palmerston North. He transferred to the Education Ministry inspectorate, and then the New Zealand Qualifications Authority, where he was in the group that developed the NCEA. He joined Sport and Recreation New Zealand (SPARC) in 2004 as a senior advisor in coaching and volunteers.

He coached the national woman's hockey team when they won a bronze at the 1998 Commonwealth Games in Malaysia, and the Wellington women's team.

Ackerley died in Wellington, New Zealand aged 61 on 3 May 2011 from skin cancer after a short illness.

References
Ultimate team player and gifted coach: Obituary in Dominion Post, 7 May 2011 page A26

External links 
 
 

Deaths from cancer in New Zealand
Deaths from skin cancer
New Zealand male field hockey players
Olympic field hockey players of New Zealand
Field hockey players at the 1976 Summer Olympics
New Zealand field hockey coaches
Sportspeople from Ashburton, New Zealand
Sportspeople from Dunedin
Field hockey players from Christchurch
University of Canterbury alumni
1949 births
2011 deaths
Olympic medalists in field hockey
New Zealand educators
People educated at Ashburton College
Medalists at the 1976 Summer Olympics
Olympic gold medalists for New Zealand
New Zealand public servants
New Zealand women's national field hockey team coaches